Need Supply Co. was a U.S.-based e-commerce brand established in 1996 as Blues Recycled Clothing. It was founded by Christopher Bossola, the current chief executive officer of Need Supply Co.'s parent company, NSTO. The company shut down in September 2020 due to financial problems brought on by the COVID-19 pandemic.

Overview 
Need Supply Co. was a clothing and lifestyle brand based in Richmond, Virginia. The business was started with 300 pairs of vintage Levi's and a 250 sq. ft. store. The company later expanded their offerings to include men's and women's clothing (including luxury fashion and premium streetwear), accessories, footwear, beauty, and home products. In Richmond, it was known for its congenial staff and as a hub for the art and fashion communities.

In 2008, Need Supply Co. launched their web store at needsupply.com and have been growing a global customer base ever since. They curate a mix of well-known brands and up-and-coming independent designers from the U.S. and abroad.

Inc. 5000 named Need Supply Co. to its 2013 list of America's Fastest-Growing Companies, earning a ranking of 723 of 5,000.

In 2015, Need Supply Co. expanded into the Japanese market with stores in Tokyo. The same year, the company started NEED, a men's and women's apparel line designed and produced exclusively for Need Supply Co. In later years, NEED expanded into additional categories, including accessories and footwear.

In 2016, Need Supply Co. minority shareholders Herschel Capital Co., acquired the Seattle-based luxury retailer, Totokaelo, and entered into a long-term operating agreement with Need Supply Co. management to oversee operations for Totokaelo's Seattle and New York retail stores, as well as their e-commerce fulfillment.

Formal measures began in 2018 to merge both Need Supply Co. and Totokaelo under a single parent company, NSTO; the merger completed in 2019. At that time, NSTO also consolidated multiple Richmond, VA offices and relocated their staff into a new global headquarters for NSTO in Richmond's Scott's Addition neighborhood.

In 2019, Need Supply Co. (now officially NSTO) was again named to the Inc. 5000 list of America's Fastest-Growing Companies, earning a ranking of 1,711.

Closure
The company permanently shut down in September 2020. The company had insufficient capital to survive a downturn in sales stemming from the COVID-19 pandemic.

Human Being Journal 
In 2012, Need Supply Co. started designing and producing a biannual print magazine entitled "Human Being Journal," which featured independent artists and designers from around the globe, in addition to features on music, food, culture, architecture, and fashion. The magazine was distributed globally and in 2014, was also translated into Japanese. The Human Being Journal translation partnership eventually led to Need Supply Co. opening stores in Japan in 2015.

References

External links 
Official Website

American companies established in 1996
1996 establishments in Virginia
Online clothing retailers of the United States
Companies based in Richmond, Virginia
Internet properties established in 2008
2020 disestablishments in Virginia
Companies disestablished due to the COVID-19 pandemic